Xinghua Township is a township of Baiquan County in western Heilongjiang province, China, located about  due north of the county seat. , it has eight villages under its administration.

See also 
 List of township-level divisions of Heilongjiang

References 

Township-level divisions of Heilongjiang
Qiqihar